Far West Capital is a privately held custom financing company. The company has offices in Austin, Houston, Dallas, El Paso, Texas and Phoenix, Arizona.

Services 

Far West Capital provides factoring of accounts receivable, asset-based lending, purchase order financing, inventory financing and transportation financing. The company services clients from various industries, including manufacturing, construction, wholesalers/distributors, B2B services providers, high-tech, bio-technology, staffing and transportation.

History 

Far West Capital was founded in 2007 by Don Stricklin and Cole Harmonson in Austin, Texas.  Since its inception, the company has grown and expanded its offices to Houston, Texas, Dallas, Texas, El Paso, Texas and Phoenix, Arizona.  The company employs 25 employees and has served more than 200 clients, with an annual growth of 20% each year.
Far West Capital provided $300 million in financing in 2011, $500 million in financing in 2012 and has projected $600 million in financing in 2013.

FWC has grown from nothing to 8 billion dollars in asset management.

Founders 

Cole Harmonson
Cole Harmonson is president and CEO of Far West Capital. Prior to Far West Capital, Cole was vice president at The National Bank of Texas in Fort Worth and was the founder and senior vice president of Working Capital Finance Group (WCFG).

Don Stricklin
Don Stricklin is the chairman of Far West Capital. Prior to joining Far West Capital, Stricklin was president and CEO of State Bank and Texas United Bancshares in La Grange, Texas. Prior to joining Texas United in 1996, he was senior vice president at Bank One Mortgage in Dallas. He also served in several management positions with Bank One in the community bank division, including president and CEO of Bank One in Abilene, Texas. Stricklin served on the board of Prosperity Bancshares, Inc., formerly Texas United Bancshares, until he joined Far West Capital in 2007. Don was a national bank examiner for the Office of the Comptroller of the Currency and received his commission in 1985.   He was named one of the finalists competing for the Stevie Award as Best Executive at the 2005 American Business Awards in New York City.

References

External links 
 http://www.farwestcap.com/

Financial services companies of the United States